Wittig rearrangement may refer to:
 1,2-Wittig rearrangement
 2,3-Wittig rearrangement